Proverbs 2 is the second chapter of the Book of Proverbs in the Hebrew Bible or the Old Testament of the Christian Bible. The book is a compilation of several wisdom literature collections, with the heading in 1:1 may be intended to regard Solomon as the traditional author of the whole book, but the dates of the individual collections are difficult to determine, and the book probably obtained its final shape in the post-exilic period. This chapter is a part of the first collection of the book.

Text
The original text is written in Hebrew language. This chapter is divided into 22 verses.

Textual witnesses
Some early manuscripts containing the text of this chapter in Hebrew are of the Masoretic Text, which includes the Aleppo Codex (10th century), and Codex Leningradensis (1008). Fragments containing parts of this chapter in Hebrew were found among the Dead Sea Scrolls including 4Q102 (4QProv; 30 BCE – 30 CE) with extant verse 1.

There is also a translation into Koine Greek known as the Septuagint, made in the last few centuries BC. Extant ancient manuscripts of the Septuagint version include Codex Vaticanus (B; B; 4th century), Codex Sinaiticus (S; BHK: S; 4th century), and Codex Alexandrinus (A; A; 5th century).

Analysis
This chapter belongs to a section regarded as the first collection in the book of Proverbs (comprising Proverbs 1–9), known as "Didactic discourses". The Jerusalem Bible describes chapters 1–9 as a prologue of the chapters 10–22:16, the so-called "[actual] proverbs of Solomon", as "the body of the book". The chapter starts with an admonition to receive wisdom (verses 1–4) followed by the benefits of it: *the knowledge of God and his protection (5–8), 
moral discernment for living (9–11), 
protection from evil men (12–15) and immoral women (16–19), and 
enablement for righteous living (20–22).
The instruction in this chapter presents "wisdom" as a human quest (verses 1–5) and a divine gift (verses 6–8), which guards its recipients from the way of evil men and loose women (verses 9–19), and guides them in the way of good men (verses 20–22).

Value of Wisdom (2:1–8)
Wisdom is to be pursued with the attentiveness to the father's words and the inclination of the heart (or 'mind') as well as the fervent desire and perseverance (verses 1–4). The prize for getting the wisdom is worth the toil (verse 5) given by God himself (verse 6), effectively maintaining God's moral order ('paths of justice') by 'shielding' that person from the pitfalls and snares of evil (verses 7–8).

Verse 1
My son, if you receive my words
and treasure up my commandments with you,
This verse opens one long conditional sentence comprising: 
(1) the protasis (“if…”) that runs through verse 4 and 
(2) the apodosis (“then…”) consisting of two parallel panels in verses 5-8 and verses 9-11, both of which are introduced by the particle , ʾaz, “then”.
"Treasure": from Hebrew , tsafan, “to store up”, which takes on "the technical meaning of memorizing the commandments of God”, so one can draw on them in need or in preparation for any situations.
The verb "treasure" qualifies the term “receive” (laqakh, in the first clause, just as “commandments” intensifies “words”. The pattern of 'intensification through parallelism' is found in verses 1 to 4.

Benefits of Wisdom (2:9–22)
The description of Wisdom as a guide and a guard (verses 9–11) echoes the introduction in Proverbs 1:2–7, is applied in following verses, in particular against 'evil men' (verses 12–15) and 'loose women' (or 'sexual impurities'; verses 16–19), so it leads to the way of good persons (verses 20–22).
The theme of the 'loose woman' (verses. 16-19) is developed in more details in Proverbs 5:1–14, 6:20–35, and 7:1–27.

Verse 16
to deliver you from the adulterous woman,
from the loose woman who has flattered you with her words
"To deliver you": from the Hebrew word , lhatsilkha; the same term used in both verses 12 and 16 for deliverance from the evil man (verses 12–15) and the evil woman (verses 16–19), each with four poetic lines.
"Adulterous woman": in Hebrew literally "strange woman"  (KJV), from the root , zur, "to be a stranger", which refers to people 'who are ethnically foreign to Israel' (Isaiah 1:7; Hosea 7:9; 8:7) or 'who are morally estranged from God or his covenant people' (Psalm 58:4; 78:30), in particular for a woman, it means "adulteress" or "prostitute" (Proverbs 2:16; 5:3, 20; 7:5; 22:14; 23:33), who may not be a foreigner but that nonetheless is estranged from or outside of the covenant community with its social and religious values.
"Loose woman":  in Hebrew literally "alien woman", from the adjective , nokhri, “foreign; alien”, which generally refer to "non-Israelite", "ethnically foreign", or "someone who is unknown or unfamiliar" though an Israelite. Here could be used as a technical term for a "harlot" or "promiscuous woman" who is 'morally alienated from God and moral society' (Proverbs 2:16; 5:20; 6:24; 7:5; 23:27) to emphasize the 'danger of being naively taken in by an unknown person.
(1) “to make smooth” (metal with hammer) and 
(2) “to use smooth words,” that is, to flatter (Psalm 5:10; 36:3; Proverbs 2:16; 7:5; 28:23; 29:5). 
The seductive speech is compared to "olive oil" (Proverbs 5:3) and is recounted (Proverbs 7:14-20).

See also

Related Bible parts: Psalm 5,  Proverbs 1, Proverbs 3, Proverbs 5, Proverbs 7, Proverbs 23

References

Sources

External links
 Jewish translations:
 Mishlei - Proverbs - Chapter 2 (Judaica Press) translation [with Rashi's commentary] at Chabad.org
 Christian translations:
 Online Bible at GospelHall.org (ESV, KJV, Darby, American Standard Version, Bible in Basic English)
 Book of Proverbs Chapter 2 King James Version
  Various versions

02